WRMX-LP, VHF analog channel 12, was an HSN-affiliated television station licensed to Nashville, Tennessee, United States.

History
WRMX first signed on January 14, 1988, by South Central Communications and was then a sister station to W24AE (now WJDE-CD), The station signed on two years after W24AE, and signed on under the callsign W12BV. Like W24AE, the station signed on carrying programming 24 hours a day, 7 days a week from Home Shopping Network, and broadcast in that format, until the station permanently went off the air on March 12, 2013. In between those times in 1995, the station changed its callsign to WRMX-LP. The callsign WRMX was taken from the then-sister radio station, which also held the call letters at that time on 96.3 FM, until it changed its callsign to WMAK in 2000. (That station is now known by the callsign of WCJK.)

The station permanently ceased operations March 12, 2013, HSN programming would continue to be carried on a digital subchannel of former sister station WJDE-LD4, until it was replaced by the then new upstart news network NewsNet (This network has since been replaced with Retro TV on that subchannel). In addition, WJDE-LD would be sold to Evangel World Prayer Center of Kentucky (A subsidiary of Word Broadcasting Network) on December 19, 2012. HSN continued to be seen on the sixth digital subchannel of full-powered Ion Television station WNPX-TV, until June 30, 2021, when HSN was replaced by the new upstart women's reality television network, TrueReal. HSN Would make its return to WJDE-LD on a new thirteenth subchannel September 1, 2021.

References

External links
 

Defunct television stations in the United States
Television channels and stations established in 1988
Television channels and stations disestablished in 2013
RMX-LP
RMX-LP